John Crawford is an American politician who serves as a member of the Tennessee House of Representatives. He is a Republican. Crawford has represented District 1 since 2017, which is based in Sullivan.

Personal information
John Crawford was born on November 29, 1967. Crawford married his wife LeAnn and he has one daughter with her which her name is Jessica. They are Baptists. Crawford attended Kingsport Christian School and studied Business and Psychology at East Tennessee State University. Other than being a politician, Crawford is also the owner of Plaques Etc., a company that sells plaques, badges, and trophies. Along with selling these items, his company also specializes in custom engraving. Crawford is also the CFO of Able Printers, a commercial printing company. Crawford is also highly involved in his community.

References

1967 births
Living people
Republican Party members of the Tennessee House of Representatives
21st-century American politicians